The Paropamisus Mountains (locally known as Selseleh-ye Safīd Kūh) is a mountain range in north western Afghanistan stretching circa 300 mi (480 km) between the western extension of the Hindu Kush in the east (near Chaghcharan, also called Firozkoh) and following the north bank of the Hari River via Herat toward the eastern extensions of Alborz Mountains in Iran in the west. All these mountains are part of the large Alpide belt.

Silver and lead deposits are found in Paropamisus. The Marghab River rise is in the area.

See also
 List of mountain ranges of the world
 Paropamisadae

External links
 Silsilah-ye Safēd Kōh on geonames.org
 Paropamisus Mountains on geographic.org
 Safid Kuh in: Universal-Lexikon (German) 2012.

References

Mountain ranges of Afghanistan
Herat Province
Ghor Province
Badghis Province